United Nations Security Council resolution 1085, adopted unanimously on 29 November 1996, after recalling Resolution 1063 (1996), the Council decided to extend the mandate of the United Nations Support Mission in Haiti for an interim period until 5 December 1996. It was further discussed in Resolution 1086 (1996).

See also
 History of Haiti
 List of United Nations Security Council Resolutions 1001 to 1100 (1995–1997)
 Operation Uphold Democracy
 United Nations Mission in Haiti

References
Text of the Resolution at undocs.org

External links
 

 1085
1996 in Haiti
 1085